One Piece is a Japanese animated television series based on the successful manga of the same name and currently has 1,054 episodes.

Series overview

Episode list

Seasons (1–8)
 List of One Piece episodes for seasons 1 to 8
 List of One Piece episodes for season 1
 List of One Piece episodes for season 2
 List of One Piece episodes for season 3
 List of One Piece episodes for season 4
 List of One Piece episodes for season 5
 List of One Piece episodes for season 6
 List of One Piece episodes for season 7
 List of One Piece episodes for season 8

Seasons (9–14)
 List of One Piece episodes for seasons 9 to 14
 List of One Piece episodes for season 9
 List of One Piece episodes for season 10
 List of One Piece episodes for season 11
 List of One Piece episodes for season 12
 List of One Piece episodes for season 13
 List of One Piece episodes for season 14

Seasons (15–present)
 List of One Piece episodes for seasons 15 to now
 List of One Piece episodes for season 15
 List of One Piece episodes for season 16
 List of One Piece episodes for season 17
 List of One Piece episodes for season 18
 List of One Piece episodes for season 19
 List of One Piece episodes for season 20

See also
 List of anime series by episode count

References

External links
 

One Piece episodes

Notes